Pocologan is a rural community in Charlotte County, New Brunswick, Canada. The community is named after the nearby Pocologan River.

Located on the Bay of Fundy between Saint John and St. George, the community originally included New River Beach.

Clam harvesting and processing was an early industry however it was mostly non-existent by the 1980s due to over-harvesting.

History

Notable people

See also
List of communities in New Brunswick

References

 Erroneous reports of plane crash off Pocologan, N.B. prompt search and media frenzy

Communities in Charlotte County, New Brunswick